Carlina curetum  is a species of the genus Carlina. It is also called carline thistle.

References 

curetum
Plants described in 1875